"Do I Make You Proud" is a soul-pop song written for American Idol season five winner Taylor Hicks by Tracy Ackerman, Andy Watkins and Paul Wilson of the Absolute production team, and co-produced by Dave Way. The song was released as a single on June 13, 2006 from the Arista record label.

Background
Hicks first performed the song on the finale of American Idol's fifth season, to which he received outstanding comments from all three judges. Simon Cowell correctly predicted that Hicks would win that year's American Idol with the performance.

Along with "Do I Make You Proud", it includes, as a B-side track, his cover of The Doobie Brothers's "Takin' It to the Streets". The American Idol judges loved his rendition of "Takin' It to the Streets" – Randy Jackson said it was not his favorite song from Hicks, but he was trying to comprehend his dance moves onstage. Paula Abdul said that the song was great and loved the energy and dancing. Simon Cowell "loved the song" and said that "that's what it's all about — having fun and being memorable." Cowell also said it was the best performance of the night.

Hicks' rendition of "Takin' It to the Streets" would become his first song to chart, peaking at number 69 on the Billboard Hot 100, due to moderate sales of digital downloads only. The song was not released as Hicks's single, since "Do I Make You Proud" was to become his first single after he won the American Idol competition.

"Weird Al" Yankovic's 2006 album Straight Outta Lynwood included a parody of "Do I Make You Proud", called "Do I Creep You Out". It is Yankovic's first parody of a singer from the Idol television series.

Content
The lyrics communicate a feeling of pride for one's accomplishments after struggling with and then finally achieving a long-term goal, all while retaining one's humility. This reflects Hicks' sudden career transformation from an independent musical artist to a celebrity.

Track listing 
 "Do I Make You Proud" – 4:10
 "Takin' It to the Streets" – 3:37

Chart performance 
Billboard confirmed that "Do I Make You Proud" sold 190,000 physical singles and 38,000 digital downloads during its first week, prompting a number-one debut on the Hot 100 for the issue dated July 1, 2006. It was only the 14th song out of over 1000 number ones to debut at number one on the Hot 100 chart. Hicks also became the fourth American Idol contestant to have a single debut at number one on the Billboard Hot 100 behind Clay Aiken, Fantasia Barrino, and Carrie Underwood. As of September 2009, "Do I Make You Proud" has sold 672,000 singles.

"Do I Make You Proud" remained number-one on the Billboard Hot 100 for one week, gradually declining until it left the chart after eight weeks, making it the first number one single in the history of the US charts to fall off the charts in less than ten weeks.

The song was Taylor Hicks' only number-one hit, as well as his only top-40 hit to date, making him a one-hit wonder on the chart.

In Canada, the single reached number one on the SoundScan singles chart and remained there for 15 consecutive weeks from June 10 to September 16, 2006.

In 2009 Billboard issued its Decade End Charts compiling the top artists and releases for the years 2000–2009. "Do I Make You Proud" charted at number 39 on the Decade End Singles Sales chart.

Charts

Year-end charts

See also
List of Canadian number-one singles of 2001–07
List of Billboard Hot 100 number-one singles of 2006

References

2006 debut singles
Taylor Hicks songs
American Idol songs
Billboard Hot 100 number-one singles
Canadian Singles Chart number-one singles
Songs written by Tracy Ackerman
Song recordings produced by Absolute (production team)
Songs written by Andy Watkins
Songs written by Paul Wilson (songwriter)
2006 songs
Arista Records singles
Soul ballads
2000s ballads